Habiba Msika, also spelled Messika (حبيبة مسيكة), (born 1903 Testour – February 21, 1930 Tunis), was a Tunisian singer, dancer and actress. 
Born Marguerite Msika, she was the niece of singer Leila Sfez.

She quickly climbed the ladder of fame under the pseudonym Habiba ("beloved"). Prototype of the free, and master of her destiny, charismatic singer and daring actress, adored by the Tunisian population, Msika was a social phenomenon in her time. The film The Fire Dance by Salma Baccar talks about her career.

Life

Youth 
She was born in the Jewish quarter of Tunis in a poor family. Her parents, Daida and Maïha, worked in the wire trade.

She learned to read and write in the school of the Israelite Alliance, which she left after seven years, through the help of her aunt, singing lessons, music theory and classical Arabic with the famous composer Khemaïs Tarnane and Egyptian tenor Hassan Bannan.

She married her cousin Victor Chetboun but their union lasted a short time.

Her first recital was held at the palace of La Marsa, where she met her lover: the Minister de la Plume.

Career 
In 1920 her career took off; she became a sex symbol and initiated the phenomenon of "soldiers of the night", the nickname for her fans, mostly young dandies of Tunisia.

It was at this time that she went with her lover to Paris, where through him she met Pablo Picasso and Coco Chanel.

In March 1925, she interpreted Romeo in Romeo and Juliet at the Ben Kamla theatre.

Death 
On the morning of February 20, 1930, her former lover Eliyahu Mimouni entered her apartment in Alfred Durand-Claye street in Tunis, and set her on fire. Badly burned, she died the next day, followed soon after by Mimouni. Msika is buried in the cemetery of Borgel in Tunis.

References

Sources

External links 
 10 taboo Arabic songs: Habiba Msika

 

Tunisian stage actresses
1903 births
1930 deaths
20th-century Tunisian actresses
20th-century Tunisian women singers
Tunisian murder victims
People murdered in Tunisia
Deaths from fire
People from Béja Governorate